This is a list of Brazilian television related events from 1971.

Events

Debuts

Television shows

Births
21 August - Carmo Dalla Vecchia, actor & model
14 November - Marcio Ballas, TV host

Deaths

See also
1971 in Brazil